A referendum was held in Cerro Chato, Uruguay on 3 July 1927.

The city is divided into three jurisdictions, belonging to the Departments of Durazno, Florida, and Treinta y Tres. People were asked whether they preferred the locality to be under only one jurisdiction.

The most peculiar fact is that, for the very first time in Latin America, women were allowed to vote.

References

1927 referendums
1927 in Uruguay
Referendums in Uruguay
1927 in South America
Women's suffrage in Uruguay